Taniela Tupou may refer to:

 Daniel Tupou (born 1991), Australian rugby league player
 Taniela Tupou (American football), (born 1992) American football defensive tackle and fullback
 Taniela Tupou (rugby union) (born 1996), Tongan-born Australian rugby union player